Son of Evil Reindeer is the second studio album by Scottish indie rock supergroup The Reindeer Section, released on 13 August 2002. It was recorded in February that year. An alternate version was released in Japan. It contained 3 bonus tracks.

Gary Lightbody had finished writing the songs of the album by January 2002. In 2004, Snow Patrol recorded a live version of "You Are My Joy" at Somerset House on 8 August 2004 for their live DVD, Live at Somerset House. This live rendition also appeared as a B-side on their "How to Be Dead" single and was later included on their 2009 compilation album Up to Now.

Track listing

Bonus tracks on Japanese edition

Personnel

Gary Lightbody – vocals, acoustic guitar, korg synthesizer
Aidan Moffat – vocals
Lee Gorton – vocals
Eugene Kelly – vocals
Charlie Clarke – acoustic guitar, background vocals
Willie Campbell – electric guitar, background vocals
John Cummings – guitar
Bob Kildea – guitar
Malcolm Middleton – guitar

Iain Archer – lap steel guitar
Jenny Reeve – violin, background vocals
Stacy Sievewright – cello
Colin Macpherson – piano, fender Rhodes piano, Hammond b-3 organ
Gareth Russell – bass
Mark McClelland – moog
Jonny Quinn – drums
Marcus Mackay – programming
Gill Mills – background vocals

References 

The Reindeer Section albums
2002 albums